Moens is a Dutch patronymic surname meaning "son of "Mo(e)n", a short form of Simon particularly common in East Flanders.   

People with this name include 

Adriaan Isebree Moens (1846–1891), Dutch physician and physiologist
Moens–Korteweg equation, biomechanic equation derived by Adriaan Isebree
Alex Moens (born 1959), Canadian political scientist
Cecilia Moens, American developmental biologist
 (1899–1978), Belgian government minister
Jean-Baptiste Moens (1833–1908), Belgian philatelist, first dealer in stamps for collectors
Marc Moens (born 1959), Belgian sprint canoeist
Oscar Moens (born 1973), Dutch football goalkeeper
Petronella Moens (1762–1843), Dutch writer, editor and feminist
Roger Moens (born 1930), Belgian middle distance runner
Wies Moens (1898–1982), Belgian literary historian, poet and pamphleteer

Moëns 
William John Charles Möens (1833–1904), English writer and antiquarian

See also
Moen (surname)
Moons and Moonen, Dutch surnames of the same origin

Dutch-language surnames
Patronymic surnames